Hyalurga discozellularis is a moth of the family Erebidae. It was described by Strand in 1921. It is found in Venezuela.

References

Hyalurga
Moths described in 1921